Police Bureau of Investigation (PBI) is a specialized unit of the Bangladesh Police that performs a criminal investigation and digital forensic service by the order of honorable court, police headquarters and the request of other police units. They investigate homicides, crime against property (dacoity, robbery, theft and fraud case etc.), sexual assaults, arson, cyber crime, and other crimes. Additional Inspector General Banaj Kumar Majumder BPM(Bar), PPM is the chief of the PBI.

Organization 
The PBI is headed by an Additional Inspector General (Addl. IGP) and functionally his office contains most administrative units. Operationally PBI are divided by two region, namely West and East region which are headed by Additional Deputy General of Police (Addl. DIG). Also PBI are divided into 8 division, 74 district and metropolitans respectively. In addition PBI has set up a Specialized Investigation & Operations (SI&O) unit in PBI HQ to run Counter Terrorism Unit (CTU), DFL (Digital Forensic Lab) to investigate organized crime, other transnational crimes and cyber crime. Each PBI division and district is run by a Special Superintendent of Police (SSP). Other ranks in the PBI are Additional Superintendent of Police (Addl. SP), Assistant Superintendent of Police (ASP), Inspector, Sub-Inspector, Assistant Sub-Inspector and Constable.

Chiefs of PBI (2012-present)

Notable cases 
 Nusrat Murder Case
 Sagira Morshed Murder Case:
 Nice Hotel Murder Case
 Murder, not suicide
 Salman Shah

Other information 
The Police Bureau of Investigation was formed on 18 September 2012 to investigate "sensational" and difficult cases. In November 2016 Bangladesh Police burned down shanties of Santals in Gaibandha and the PBI was tasked to identify the responsible police officers. They were charged with the investigation of the 2017 South Surma Upazila bombings. PBI has been tasked to collect evidence from terrorist attacks such as the 2017 RAB base suicide attack and the raid on the militant base in Sitkundia. The agency is responsible for the investigation of human trafficking.

References

External links
 https://www.bbc.com/news/world-asia-48441604

Police units of Bangladesh
2012 establishments in Bangladesh
Bangladeshi intelligence agencies
Domestic intelligence agencies
Government agencies established in 2012
Bangladesh Police